Néstor Lambertus (August 12, 1906 – February 2, 1987) was a Dominican outfielder in the Negro leagues in the 1920s.

A native of Azua, Dominican Republic, Lambertus played for the Cuban Stars (East) in 1929. In his 23 recorded games, he posted 22 hits in 83 plate appearances. Lambertus died in New York, New York in 1987 at age 80.

References

External links
 and Seamheads

1906 births
1987 deaths
Cuban Stars (East) players
20th-century African-American sportspeople